Outlaw Blues

 Outlaw Blues 1977 film
Outlaw Blues, Peter Fonda song written by John Oates for the film, and single 
Outlaw Blues (Bob Dylan song)